Turbonilla lactea is a species of sea snail, a marine gastropod mollusk in the family Pyramidellidae, the pyrams and their allies.

Description
The length of the shell varies between 3 mm and 8 mm. The shell consists of almost stright-sided whorls with deep, flat sutures. Its shell, marked with "thick, flat, slightly sinuous, oblique costae" that are "indistinct on the first whorl" and prominent thereafter, has a milky-white colour, on which the Turbonilla lactea species name is based.

Distribution
This species occurs in the following locations:
 Atlantic Europe
 Azores Exclusive Economic Zone
 Belgian Exclusive Economic Zone
 British Isles
 Canary Islands
 Cape Verde
 Dorset
 European waters (ERMS scope)
 Goote Bank
 Greek Exclusive Economic Zone
 Irish Exclusive economic Zone
 Mediterranean Sea
 Portuguese Exclusive Economic Zone
 São Tomé and Príncipe Exclusive Economic Zone
 Spanish Exclusive Economic Zone
 United Kingdom Exclusive Economic Zone
 Wimereux

Notes
Additional information regarding this species:
 Synonymy: It is unclear why some British authors (e.g. Winckworth, 1932; Graham, 1971; McKay & Smith, 1979) prefer the junior synonym Turbonilla elegantissima (Montagu, 1803).

References

External links
 To Biodiversity Heritage Library (45 publications)
 To CLEMAM
 To Encyclopedia of Life
 To GenBank
 To Marine Species Identification Portal
 To World Register of Marine Species
 

lactea
Gastropods described in 1758
Taxa named by Carl Linnaeus
Molluscs of the Atlantic Ocean
Molluscs of the Mediterranean Sea
Invertebrates of the North Sea